Michael Jason Crain (born February 22, 1974) is an American guitarist, singer, producer and songwriter best known as the guitarist of the bands Kill the Capulets, Retox and Dead Cross. He has collaborated with Justin Pearson, Ryan Bergmann, Kevin Avery, Dave Lombardo, Mike Patton among many others.

Early life 

When Michael was 6 years old he started listening to Kiss records and was obsessed with their make up and how they looked. So he started to perform for his family pretending to sing and playing guitar. When he was 11 years old his dad bought him his first cheap electric guitar. At that time he was obsessed with the Van Halen’s guitar player Edward Van Halen. 
His father was a drummer and was always in bands throughout his life so he was very well acquainted with the lives of musicians and how bands functioned. This was all very useful knowledge and experience when he started his first band After School Special.
With 15 years old Michael had been exposed to heavy metal, thrash metal, and punk and became obsessed with Slayer, Metallica, DRI, MOD, SOD, Iron Maiden, Black Flag, Death(Florida), Suicidal Tendencies, Exodus and Sex Pistols.
He was also influenced for Rock n roll bands introduced by his father, like Steely Dan, Led Zeppelin, The Beatles, Robin Trower and Jimi Hendrix
His mother listened to a lot of soul, R&B, and Disco which influenced him incredibly. Acts such as Stevie Wonder, Michael Jackson, Sade, Earth Wind and Fire, Diana Ross, Smokey Robinson, The Temptations and several other motown artists.

Music career

The festival of the dead deer 
The festival of the dead deer is a post-punk band founded in 1997 in Los Angeles, CA. The current members are Michael Crain, Chris Hathwell (Moving Units) and Dylan Gordon.
In 1996 they released their first single called The festival of the dead deer and in 1999 The festival of the dead deer/ The Crimson Curse produced by the independent label Three One G founded by Justin Pearson and also a compilation called The many faces of Mental illness (A collection) made in 1998 by Three One G label.

Kill the Capulets 
Is a post-punk band founded in 2009 in Los Angeles- California. The members are Michael Crain (Vocalist and guitarist), Erick Anguiano, Keith Hendriksen and Rockey Crane. In 2014 the album The Stranger was produced by Three One G label.

Retox 
Was birthed in Southern California, specifically in San Diego and Los Angeles during the later part of 2010. Influenced by political disdain, horror, and sarcasm Retox has been described as punk, post-punk, hardcore, metal, and even power violence. The members are Justin Pearson (The Locust, Dead Cross, Head Wound City), Michael Crain (Dead Cross, Festival of Dead Deer), Ryan Bergmann, and Kevin Avery (Planet B).

Dead Cross 
Formed in Southern California in November 2015 the band offers a frantic-paced mix of hardcore and punk.  Produced by Ross Robinson  with the drummer Dave Lombardo (Slayer, Suicidal tendencies), the guitarist Michael Crain (Retox), bassist Justin Pearson (Retox) and the vocalist Mike Patton (Faith no more, fantômas). In 2017 the album called Dead Cross was produced by Mike Patton’s label Ipecac Recordings and also Three One G label.

Discography

The Festival of the dead deer 
The Festival of the dead deer (1996)
Label: Blackbean and Placenta Tape Club
Format: Vinyl 7”, 33 ⅓ RPM, White label
Style: Hardcore, Emo.

The Many Faces of Mental Illness (A Collection). (1998)
Label: Three One G
Format: Vinyl, LP, Compilation, Limited edition, Clear with Red Spot
Style: Hardcore

The Festival of the dead deer/The Crimson Curse (1999)
Label: Three One G

Kill the Capulets 
Various artists – KXLU 88.9FM Live Vol. II (1997)
Label: KXLU 12

The Stranger (2014)
Label: Three One G

Retox 
Ugly animals (2011)
Label:  Ipecac Recordings, Three One G

YPLL (2013)
Label: Epitaph, Three One G

Beneath California (2015)
Label: Epitaph, Three One G

Retox (2011)
Label: Three One G

Violitionist Sessions (2012)
Label: Violitionist Sessions

NRWS/Retox (2014)
Label: Three One G

NRWS/Retox (2015)
Label: French Kiss Label Group
Format: Vinyl 7”

Dead Cross 
Dead Cross II (2022)
Label: Ipecac Recordings, Three One G

Dead Cross (2017)
Label: Ipecac Recordings, Three One G

Singles & EPs
Dead Cross (2018)
Label: Ipecac Recordings

EP   (2020)

https://mikecrain1.bandcamp.com/

  Single & EP (2021)
https://www.radicalguyinc.org/

References 

1974 births
Living people
American male guitarists
American singer-songwriters
American male singer-songwriters
Dead Cross members